{{DISPLAYTITLE:C20H38O2}}
The molecular formula C20H30O may refer to:

 Ethyl oleate
 Gadoleic acid
 Vaccenyl acetate
 Eicosenoic acid
 Paullinic acid, also called 7-Eicosenoic acid
 Prostanoic acid, also called 9-Eicosenoic acid
 11-Eicosenoic acid, also called gondoic acid

Molecular formulas